Andre Young (born March 16, 1990) is a retired American professional basketball player. Standing at 5 ft 9 in (1.75 m), Young played the point guard or shooting guard position. He played four years of collegiate basketball with Clemson followed by three seasons of playing professionally in multiple countries in Europe.

Career
After playing college basketball for the Clemson Tigers, Young started his professional career in the Netherlands with EiffelTowers Den Bosch from the Dutch Basketball League. In his first season, he won the league's Most Valuable Player award and got a place in the All-DBL Team. With EiffelTowers, Young won the Dutch Cup. However, he did not win the national championship despite finishing first in the regular season.

On June 12, 2013, Young signed with BC Goverla in the Ukrainian Basketball SuperLeague. He left the team in March 2014 during the ongoing Ukrainian revolution.

For the 2014–15 season, Young signed with Chorale Roanne of the French second tier Pro B.

For the 2015–16 season, he signed with another Pro B side in Boulazac Basket Dordogne. On July 28, 2015, Young was released by Boulazac after suffering a serious injury.

Honours

With club
EiffelTowers Den Bosch
NBB Cup: 2012–13

Individual awards
DBL Most Valuable Player: 2012–13
All-DBL Team: 2012–13
DBL All-Star: 2013
DBL Three-Point shootout champion: 2013
All-ACC Defensive Team: 2011–12

References

1990 births
Living people
American expatriate basketball people in France
American expatriate basketball people in the Netherlands
American expatriate basketball people in Ukraine
Basketball players from Georgia (U.S. state)
Clemson Tigers men's basketball players
Dutch Basketball League players
Point guards
Heroes Den Bosch players
BC Hoverla players
Chorale Roanne Basket players
Sportspeople from Albany, Georgia
American men's basketball players